The Thirty-third Oklahoma Legislature was a meeting of the legislative branch of the government of Oklahoma, composed of the Senate and the House of Representatives. It met in Oklahoma City from January 5, 1971, to January 2, 1973, during the term of Governor David Hall.

Finis Smith served as the President pro tempore of the Oklahoma Senate and Rex Privett served as the Speaker of the Oklahoma House of Representatives.

Dates of sessions
First regular session: January 5-June 11, 1971
Special session: July 1, 1971
Second regular session: January 4-March 31, 1972
Previous: 32nd Legislature • Next: 34th Legislature

Party composition

Senate

House of Representatives

Major legislation

Enacted
1971 Legislative Session
Taxes - HB 1181 increased the taxes on the oil and gas industry by approximately $21 million.

Leadership
President of the Senate: Lieutenant Governor George Nigh
President Pro Tem: Finis Smith
Speaker of the House: Rex Privett
Speaker Pro Tempore: Joseph Mountford
House Majority Floor Leader: Leland Wolf
House Minority Leader: Charles Ford

Staff
Chief Clerk of the House: Louise Stockton

Membership

Senate

Table based on 2005 Oklahoma Almanac.

House of Representatives

Table based on database of historic members.

References

External links
Oklahoma Senate
Oklahoma House of Representatives

Oklahoma legislative sessions
1971 in Oklahoma
1972 in Oklahoma
1971 U.S. legislative sessions
1972 U.S. legislative sessions